A Marie biscuit is a type of biscuit similar to a rich tea biscuit. It is also known (in various languages) as María, Mariebon and Marietta, amongst other names.

Description 
The biscuit is round and usually has the name embossed upon its top surface, the edges of which are also embossed with an intricate design. It is made with wheat flour, sugar, palm oil or sunflower seed oil and, unlike the rich tea biscuit, is typically vanilla-flavoured.

History 
The Marie biscuit was created by the London bakery Peek Freans in 1874 to commemorate the marriage of the Grand Duchess Maria Alexandrovna of Russia to the Duke of Edinburgh. It became popular throughout Europe, particularly in Portugal and Spain where, following the Civil War, the biscuit became a symbol of the country's economic recovery after bakeries produced mass quantities to consume a surplus of wheat.
Marie biscuits have become popular in South Africa after going into production by Bakers Biscuits in 1898.

Consumption 

Many consider that the plain flavour of Maries makes them, like rich tea biscuits, particularly suitable for dunking in tea. Other popular methods of consuming the biscuit include using two to make a sandwich with butter and Marmite or condensed milk spread in between; covering it with golden syrup; or crumbling it up in custard and jelly (gelatin dessert). Marie biscuits are frequently served to children, and to infants who may be served the biscuits softened in milk as their first 'solid' food. Marie biscuits are also a common ingredient in home-baking recipes.

In Spain, natillas custard is typically served with a Maria biscuit on top.  In Uruguay, they are served filled with dulce de leche and sprinkled with shredded coconut. In Brazil, they are soaked in milk and then stacked in layers of chocolate and vanilla-flavoured custard cream, with whipped cream and crushed cashew nuts on top to make pavê, a popular Brazilian dessert. In Ireland, the biscuits are known as Marietta and manufactured by Jacob's. In Malaysia, people use them mainly for making batik cake.

Manufacturers 

The major international manufacturers (initially sorted by country name):

References

External links 
 Biscuit of the Week, a review at Nice Cup of Tea and a Sit Down
 Review of Maria Cookies, reviews of various international brands
 Photos of Marie biscuits from various countries

Biscuits